Trevor Harding is a Canadian politician, who represented the electoral district of Faro in the Yukon Legislative Assembly from 1992 to 2001.

A member of the Yukon New Democratic Party, he served as the party's interim leader in 2000 following the resignation of Piers McDonald. Following his stint as the party's interim leader, he resigned from the legislature and was succeeded by Jim McLachlan of the Yukon Liberal Party in a by-election.

Following his retirement from politics, Harding moved to Calgary, Alberta and launched Zero Gravity, a marketing and communications company.

Electoral record

2000 general election

|-

|NDP
| Trevor Harding
| align="right"| 177
| align="right"| 76.6%
| align="right"| -17.7%
 
| Liberal
| Jim McLachlan
| align="right"| 53
| align="right"| 22.9%
| align="right"| +17.7%
|- bgcolor="white"
!align="left" colspan=3|Total
! align=right| 231
! align=right| 100.0%
! align=right| –
|}

1996 general election

|-

|NDP
| Trevor Harding
| align="right"| 530
| align="right"| 94.3%
| align="right"| +41.1%

| Liberal
| Ed Peake
| align="right"| 29
| align="right"| 5.2%
| align="right"| -41.0%
|- bgcolor="white"
!align="left" colspan=3|Total
! align=right| 562
! align=right| 100.0%
! align=right| –
|}

1992 general election

|-

|NDP
| Trevor Harding
| align="right"| 388
| align="right"| 53.2%
| align="right"| +10.4%
|-

| Liberal
| Jim McLachlan
| align="right"| 337
| align="right"| 46.2%
| align="right"| +9.1%
|- bgcolor="white"
!align="left" colspan=3|Total
! align=right| 729
! align=right| 100.0%
! align=right| –
|}

References

External links
 Trevor Harding

Living people
Yukon New Democratic Party leaders
1965 births